Rimush (or Rimuš,  Ri-mu-uš) was the second king of the Akkadian Empire. He was the son of Sargon of Akkad and Queen Tashlultum. He was succeeded by his brother Manishtushu, and was an uncle of Naram-Sin of Akkad. Rimush reported having a statue of himself made out of tin, then a recent introduction to the region.

Background
According to the Sumerian King List, his reign lasted 9 years (though variant copies read 7 or 15 years.) There is one surviving year-name for an unknown year in his reign: "mu ud-nun{ki} / adab{ki} hul-a = Year in which Adab was destroyed". Tradition gives that he was assassinated, as the Bārûtu, “art of the diviner”, a first millennium compendium of extispicy, records “Omen of king Rimuš, whom his courtiers killed with their seals”. He was succeeded by his brother Manishtushu. The Ur III version of the Sumerian King List inverts the order of Rimush and Manishtushu. A number of his votive offerings have been found in excavated temples in several Mesopotamian cities.

Destruction of Sumerian city-states

According to his inscriptions, he faced widespread revolts, and had to reconquer the cities of Ur, Umma, Adab, Lagash, Der, and Kazallu from rebellious ensis:

Only one year name is preserved for Rimush, and it says "Year in which Adab was destroyed".

Rimush introduced mass slaughter and large scale destruction of the Sumerian city-states, and maintained meticulous records of his destructions. Most of the major Sumerian cities were destroyed, and Sumerian human losses were enormous:

Victory Stele of Rimush over Lagash

A Victory Stele in several fragments (three in total, Louvre Museum, AO 2678 for the relief and AO 2679 for the inscriptions, with possibly another fragment from the Yale Babylonian Collection YBC 2409) has been attributed to Rimush on stylistic and epigraphical grounds. One of the fragments mentions Akkad and Lagash. The style is airy and the figures are more refined than those from the time of Sargon of Akkad. One fragment in the main inscription probably contains parts of the name of Rimush himself. 

It is thought that the stele represents the defeat of Lagash by the troops of Akkad. The prisoners depicted in the relief are visibly Mesopotamian, and their slaughtering at the hand of Akkadian soldiers is consistent with the known accounts of Rimush. The stele was excavated in ancient Girsu, one of the main cities of the territory of Lagash. The inscription describes the attribution of large plots of land from Lagash to the Akkadian nobility, following the victory.

Campaigns against Elam and Marhashi

There are also records of victorious campaigns against Elam and Marhashi (Sumerian name for the Akkadian "Parahshum") in his 3rd year. According to the account, troops from the Indus Valley civilization (Meluhha) also participated in the conflict:

The campaign resulted in 16,212 killed on the side of the enemies, and 4,216 captured and enslaved. After the victorious campaigns of Rimush, under his successor Manishtushu, Elam would be ruled by Akkadian Military Governors, starting with Eshpum, and Pashime, on the Iranian coast, was ruled by an Akkadian Governor named Ilshu-rabi. Upon his return from conquering Elam Rimush gave thanks to the deity of Nippur, Enlil, with 30 mana of gold, 3,600 mana of copper, and 360 slaves.

Gallery

Artifacts in the name of Rimush

See also

History of Sumer

External links
 Complete Rimush inscriptions

References

3rd-millennium BC births
3rd-millennium BC deaths
23rd-century BC kings of Akkad
Sumerian kings
Akkadian people
Kings of the Universe
Akkadian Empire
Male murder victims